Mik Kersten is a Polish- Canadian computer specialist who created and leads the open-source Eclipse Mylyn project. Kersten invented the Task-Focused Interface technology underlying Mylyn while working on his PhD at the University of British Columbia in Vancouver, British Columbia, Canada. While completing his PhD, Kersten and his PhD supervisor, Gail C. Murphy, founded Tasktop Technologies, which provided productivity software built on the Mylyn technology, but now focuses on providing Value stream management software around Mik's book Project to Product.

References

External links
Blog with contributions by Mik Kersten
Publications by Mik Kersten (archive)
Flow Framework

1975 births
Living people
Scientists from Warsaw
Polish emigrants to Canada
University of British Columbia alumni
Polish computer scientists
Canadian computer scientists